Following the 2011 Tōhoku earthquake and tsunami, Japan received messages of condolence and offers of assistance from a range of international leaders. According to Japan's foreign ministry, 163 countries and regions, and 43 international organizations had offered assistance to Japan as of September 15, 2011. The magnitude of the earthquake was estimated at 9.1. This article is a list of charitable and humanitarian responses to the disaster from governments and non-governmental organizations. As of March 2012, donations to areas affected by the disaster totalled ¥520 billion and 930,000 people have assisted in disaster recovery efforts.

Requesting and handling of foreign aid

Japan had a history of blocking or slowing foreign rescue teams in case of disaster, most notably the crash of Japan Airlines Flight 123 in 1985 and the Great Hanshin earthquake in 1995. This time the Japanese government made shift response to request foreign help.

At 18:00, March 11, 2011, the Foreign Ministry of Japan announced to the public that it had specifically requested eight countries to send teams to help Japan, including South Korea, Singapore, Germany, Switzerland, the United States, China, the United Kingdom and New Zealand. Later, it also requested the activation of the International Charter on Space and Major Disasters, allowing diverse satellite imagery of affected regions to be readily shared with rescue and aid organizations.

The Japanese government softened rules for various matters after being subjected to huge criticism in the Great Hanshin earthquake for not being flexible in accepting foreign aid, including quarantining foreign rescue dogs and foreign goods, using medicine unapproved in Japan brought by foreign aid teams, customs tax for humanitarian goods, etc. The effectiveness of the Japanese bureaucracy in handling international aid had been subject to much academic research.

Governmental responses

 The city of Kandahar donated $50,000 to Japan.
 Prime Minister Sali Berisha announced in a cabinet meeting that his government was sending US$100,000 in aid.
 The government of Armenia donated $500,000 in humanitarian assistance and offered to send a rescue team of 25 people from the Ministry of Emergency Situations.

 prepared the frigate HMAS Sydney and heavy landing ship HMAS Tobruk to carry helicopters. Australian Army engineers and medical teams would be sent to Japan if this was requested by the Japanese government. Fire and Rescue NSW sent a 76-member Urban Search and Rescue team, some of which had recently been rotated through the Christchurch earthquake recovery effort, and 20 tonnes of rescue equipment. The team was transported to Japan by a Royal Australian Air Force C-17 Globemaster III transport aircraft as Operation Pacific Assist, which remained in the country to contribute to the disaster relief effort. Two other RAAF C-17's were deployed to Japan to transport supplies and equipment, all three moving over one million pounds of cargo.
 The government of Azerbaijan donated $1 million in aid to Japan for the elimination of the consequences of the disaster.
 sent a search and rescue team consisting of a medical wing to Japan. Bangladesh also gave medicine, 2,000 blankets, 500 rubber boots and 1,000 rubber gloves.
 sent blankets, food and bottled water, and offered housing in its countryside for homeless Japanese citizens.
 Prime Minister Hun Sen ordered the Cambodian government to donate US$100,000 in aid.
 initially offered a 17-member victim identification team and chemical, biological, radiological and nuclear decontamination equipment. Prime Minister Stephen Harper offered Canadian Forces airlift, medical and engineering capabilities. On March 16, 2011, Canada announced that it will send further aid. Canada has readied staff with nuclear expertise. The Canadian Red Cross alone has collected over $6 million in aid. Canada put on standby members of the Canadian military DART team in order to offer a continuous supply of fresh drinking water.
, sent US$167,000 in aid along with a 15-member rescue team which left Beijing on March 13, 2011, with an additional pledge of RMB 30 million Chinese yuan (US$4.57 million) of humanitarian supplies announced by China's Ministry of Commerce the following day. The Chinese government decided to donate 20,000 tons of fuel consisting of 10,000 tons of gasoline and 10,000 tons of diesel. The Chinese navy hospital ship Peace Ark was standing by to assist whilst awaiting approval from Japan, but Japan declined the offer. The northeastern Chinese city of Changchun, a sister city of Sendai, sent 10 tonnes of drinking water to Japan. The provincial government of Jilin also said it will donate 100,000 US dollars to the Miyagi prefecture government while the municipal government of Changchun, capital of Jilin, pledged 500,000 Renminbi to the municipal government of Sendai. A super-sized 62-meter long mechanized water-pump arm was donated by China's Sany group, along with an accompanying team of 5 engineers and consultants to quell the overheating and radiation problems of the crippled Fukushima nuclear power plant on 23 March 2011.
 The Croatian government donated 500,000 as financial aid and offered medical capacities and hospitality for injured in the disaster. On March 18, the Croatian Red Cross transferred 520,000 to the Japanese Red Cross Society. From March 12, more than 700,000 have been raised, of which 630,000 by public and private donations and more than 65,000 by telephone calls made by Croatian citizens. The Croatian Mountain Rescue Service put itself at service if necessary, as well as the National Protection and Rescue Directorate.
 offered to send a hundred men to remove the debris.
 The Estonian government donated 200,000.
 sent rescue teams consisting of 134 members. The French nuclear accident response organization Groupe INTRA has shipped some of its radiation-hardened mobile robot equipment to Japan to help with the Fukushima Daiichi nuclear accident. 130 tonnes of equipment has been shipped to Japan.
 donated US$1 million via the Red Cross to relief efforts in Japan.
 sent search and rescue specialists from the Technisches Hilfswerk. Furthermore, the German Aerospace Center provided TerraSAR-X- and RapidEye-satellite imagery of the affected area.
: According to the MTI, the Hungarian National Disaster Management sent a rescue team to the area, consisting of eight technical rescue team members and a specialist officer. The team travelled to the disaster site on March 12.
 sent woolen clothing and blankets, with additional plans to send 22 metric tons of woolen blankets.Team of NDRF was deployed from 27/03/2011 to 07/04/2011. Team managed to extricate 07 bodies from the rubble more than two weeks after the disaster struck the area. The team recovered and handed over cash worth fifty million yen to the authorities apart from the other valuables
 sent rescue workers, medical assistance and supplies. Indonesia's government also donated US$2 million.
 shipped 50,000 cans of tuna and hot food distributed to 500 people in Japan. Four physicians and first responders were also dispatched to Japan from the Iranian Red Crescent Society. 

 sent members of the humanitarian aid organizations IsraAID and ZAKA, which consist of first responders, search and rescue specialists, logistical, emergency medical personnel and water specialists to the devastated regions of Japan. Israel also established a field hospital near Minamisanriku, 290 miles north of Tokyo. An initial team of five set up the surgery in preparation for a larger team once needs are assessed. Israel also provided aid including mattresses, blankets, coats, gloves and chemical toilets for those left homeless by the disaster. On March 27, a 53-member delegation of medical personnel from the Home Front Command and the IDF’s Medical Corps arrived and opened a clinic on March 29. The clinic includes surgical, pediatric and maternity wards, an intensive care unit, pharmacy and laboratory. The delegation also brought 62 tons of medical supplies.
 sent search and rescue specialists. An unidentified number of Red Cross personnel travelled to Japan.
 contributed large amounts of resources with a total of US$550,000,000 in crude oil and other humanitarian aid supplies.<ref>{{cite news|url=http://www.kuna.net.kw/ArticleDetails.aspx?id=2226523&language=en|title="Kuwaits quake aid deeply appreciated" – Japan Red Cross chief|date=12 March 2012}}</ref>
 donated US$100,000 in aid.
's government has helped Japan with 100,000 euros. The funds would be allocated to reconstruction of damaged buildings from the earthquake. Additionally, the Macedonian authorities announced they were in contact with the Japanese embassy in order to provide any future assistance if required.
 Prime Minister Najib Razak and Foreign Minister Anifah Aman sent Special Malaysia Disaster Assistance and Rescue Team (SMART), with doctors and medical assistants. Mercy Malaysia left Kuala Lumpur International Airport and went to Narita International Airport.
 shipped 90,000 cans of tuna to feed the people in the worst affected areas.
 sent eight search and rescue specialists, five search dogs, and two specialists in structural evaluation.
 sent eleven search and rescue specialists, seven search dogs, and attentional equipment. The unit was part of the Force Publique's Corps des Sapeurs-Pompiers.
 government announced that the country sent rescue teams composed of 12 members from the National Emergency Management Agency of Mongolia to Japan after it had donated US$1 million and relief supplies. The people of Mongolia from workers to the President donated their wages.
 sent letters of condolences and donations, including a donation of 100,000 US dollars.
 donated US$1,000,000 in emergency relief funds.
 sent an urban search and rescue team. They had spent the previous three weeks searching buildings following the 2011 Christchurch earthquake New Zealand also sent 15 tonnes of rescue equipment. The government donated $2 million to the Japanese Red Cross Society to support relief efforts.
 donated US$100,000 to the relief fund, with North Korean leader Kim Jong-il personally donating US$500,000 to Chongryon Korean residents in Japan.
 The government of Pakistan sent two Pakistan Air Force C130 cargo airplanes carrying 24 tons of relief goods, which contained high energy biscuits, milk packs and drinking water for the areas affected by the earthquake. The Pakistani embassy in Tokyo sent a team to Sendai in Miyagi Prefecture on March 15 to assess the situation and welfare of affected residents. A volunteer team organized by the Pakistani community in Japan was also sent to Sendai with food supplies.

 The Philippine government made ready to deploy a joint rescue mission composed of 41 members from three of its best search and rescue teams. It was to be complemented by a Philippine Air Force C-130 cargo plane and its crew. The Philippine Government also donated US$10 million to Japan. A 2-man team has been sent in advance to assess the situation. Due to the overwhelming response by the global community its search and rescue teams were not deployed. Instead it offered relief goods with the AFP's six-man advance team being in charge of distribution.
 The Polish government has offered to help rescue trapped Japanese citizens in affected areas. Polish firefighters comprised the team sent by the European Union to help Japan.
 On June, 28th, relief supplies from the Romanian government arrived at Narita Airport following the Great East Japan Earthquake. The relief supplies are 15,360 bottles of mineral water (2 liters), which were donated to the affected areas.
 State-controlled gas giant Gazprom provided additional liquefied natural gas supplies, the company diverting two tankers of 150,000 tons to the affected area. Russia's Emergencies Ministry official Irina Andrianova confirmed that Russia will send one Mi-26 helicopter along with a team of 50 Russian rescuers to search for survivors, and promised more aid. A team of Russian rescuers will join the search for survivors. According to Russia’s Emergencies Ministry spokesperson Irina Andrianova, "An Il-76 plane of the Russian Emergencies Ministry sent 50 rescuers, three relief and rescue vehicles and the necessary equipment which later arrived and covered by RT news media.” The Russian emergency services agency EMERCOM offered 40 people three search and rescue dogs. Russia has sent liquidators of the Chernobyl disaster to Japan. The Russian relief group was among the largest to go to Japan to render aid and consists of 161 personnel.
 provided petroleum products equivalent to US$20 million through the Saudi Arabian state oil company, Saudi Aramco. After coordination between Japan and the Kingdom of Saudi Arabia following this offer, the two countries agreed to establish the Saudi LPG Emergency Relief Fund within the Japan LP Gas Association and to distribute support to the region through the fund.
 First Deputy Prime Minister and Minister of the Interior Ivica Dacic ordered a Division of Emergency Situations rescue team, part of the Serbian Ministry of the Interior, to ready for deployment to Japan. Many cities announced sending supporting financial aid. One of the first to announce aid was the city of Prokuplje, who sent $10,000. There is a Serbian Red Cross, mobile operators and other independent fundraising initiatives. The Serbian Red Cross raised US$2,321,570.
 The Singapore Red Cross (SRC) appointed by the Ministry of Foreign Affairs coordinated Singapore’s relief efforts to Japan. The government of Singapore donated S$500,000 and sent a search and rescue team. The SRC sent 2 consignments of relief goods consisting of 10,000 bottles of drinking water (500 ml), 6,200 blankets, 200 mattresses and 4,000 collapsible water containers. The SRC raised a total of S$4.1 million (excluding the S$500,000 by the government) for the relief efforts.
 sent the 'Rescue South Africa Disaster Response' team to help with rescue and relief activities in the city of Ishinomaki, Miyagi Prefecture.

 was among the first foreign emergency rescue teams consisting of 5 rescuers and 2 rescue dogs who arrived in Japan on March 12, while another team of 102 rescuers arrived 2 days later. The government, corporations, media, and community groups including former comfort women lead campaigns for donation. By 22 March, the government announced that the donations reached 58.1 billion KRW (52 million USD). In addition to human aid, Korea sent boric acid to weaken nuclear reactions and power sources for electricity. Many provinces have offered aid as well. Gyeonggi-do offered US$1 million and raised additional aid. The South Korean consulate staffs in Sendai were crucial in escorting a Croatian citizen, Vinko Hut Kono, safely to the Akita Airport.
, which was still recovering from the 2004 Indian Ocean tsunami, announced US$1 million in aid, as well a team of medical and rescue workers.
 sent The Swiss rescue team consist of 25 rescuers and nine sniffer dogs to Japan. Two specialists from the Swiss Humanitarian Aid Unit in Beijing flew into the country.

 provided over US$252 million in combined aid, and were among the largest contributors in monetary aid.President touts Taiwan's relief efforts for Japan, Central News Agency, March 27, 2011. President Ma Ying-jeou asked the Ministry of Foreign Affairs to donate NT$100 million (approximately 300 million Japanese yen or US$3.3 million) to Japan two days after the disaster. On the third and the fourth day respectively, two rescue teams, a 35-member civilian-organized team and a 28-member Ministry of the Interior team, were dispatched to Sendai and other affected areas.馳援日本震災 台搜救隊出發 ，Central News Agency, March 14, 2011. Besides the central government's actions, major political parties, many local governments, schools, companies, and charities arranged fundraising concerts and events.平安日本　民進黨募4500萬 ，中央社，2011年3月23日。 The Speaker of Congress, Wang Jin-pyng, and other officials visited Japan on April 20 to give a donation. By the end of 2011, the government, Red Cross Society of Taiwan, Tzu Chi Foundation, and the Chi Mei Corporation, among other civilian organizations and celebrities, collected more than NT$7,364 million (approximately 20,000 million Japanese yen or US$252 million) from the public. Among them, Mr. Chang Yung-fa, chairman of the Evergreen Group, donated 1 billion Japanese yen (approximately US$12,350,000).因應日本核災，政府持續加強應變措施，行政院即時新聞，2011/4/22。 Starting March 14, the government and other organizations sent about one thousand tons of generators, sleeping bags, blankets, clothes, food, and other daily essentials to Japan.搶黃金救援 路竹會待命赴日 , Central News Agency, March 14, 2011. In particular, tens of volunteers of the Tzu Chi Foundation advanced to the disaster areas to offer hot food, drinks, materials, and shelters for victims.馳援日本 慈濟長途供熱食 . Tzu Chi. 17 March 2011.Tzu Chi team reaches Ofunato. Tzu Chi. 26 March 2011. In addition, the Taiwanese government also assisted more than one thousand Taiwanese, Japanese, American, European, and other foreign nationals in relocating to Taiwan during the nuclear emergency. Speaker Wang and the mayor of Tainan, William Lai, led hundreds of Taiwanese tourists to visit Japan in May and June to show support.市長賴清德揪團訪日轟動日本各界，日光市府會設宴感謝臺南市在困境中相挺的情誼，台南市政府新聞及國際關係處，2011/6/12。 The Tourism bureau, the Tainan City Government among other institutions also provided opportunities for victims in the affected regions free tours to Taiwan for relief and to demonstrate how Taiwan recovered from the 1999 921 earthquake.Time for Taiwan 觀光美食饗宴-臺灣美食、日本上菜, 中華民國交通部, 2012-05-11

 The Thai government made an initial offer of 5 million baht (around $167,000), with an additional donation of 200 million baht (or about US$6.6 million), accompanied by 15,000 tons of rice, tinned food, as well as other necessities such as blankets and clothing. Search-and-rescue teams consisting of 35 specialist medic crews proficient in Japanese, officials and sniffer dogs were also dispatched. Aside from this, the Thai public through massive fundraising campaigns spearheaded by major local television stations, private firms, banks and other charitable organizations, including the Thai Red Cross, also donated more than 400 million baht (or more than US$12 million) in relief funds.
 Disaster and Emergency Management Presidency of the Republic of Turkey offered humanitarian assistance: 52 tonnes of humanitarian aid, valued at US$360,000, were shipped to Tokyo. The aid materials consisted of 5,000 blankets, 10,000 cans of tuna, 20,000 cans of peas, 12,000 cans of pike, and 10,000 iodine tablets to prevent radiation absorption.
 sent a cargo aircraft full of relief supplies, including gas masks, radiometers, and 2,000 blankets. A rescue team was also dispatched to Japan to provide assistance. The government of Ukraine also stated that they would be ready to provide more aid if requested.
 sent 70 rescuers to Japan, including two search dogs, a medical support team and 11 tons of specialised rescue equipment.

 designated its military response to the earthquake and tsunami as Operation Tomodachi (Japanese for "friend"). Various branches of the military participated, notably the  carrier group and aviators based at Yokota Air Base, among several other personnel. The US Agency for International Development's Office of Foreign Disaster Assistance sent Urban Search and Rescue California Task Force 2 and Virginia Task Force 1, some of whom worked with Canadian SARS teams in Miyagi Prefecture. US personnel were dispatched to restore the Sendai airport, which sustained extensive damage and flooding. The State Department moved its embassy operations, set up contact information systems and issued travel advisories and later evacuation orders for American civilians.
 Carlsberg Uzbekistan produced beer in bottles with notes that read Yaponiyani qoʻllab-quvvatlaylik! (Let's support Japan!).
 The Vietnam Red Cross National Headquarters launched Official Appeal on March 16, 2011, to call people from all ministries, governmental agencies, Fatherland Front, organizations, corporations, enterprises, and people all over Vietnam to assist people affected by the tsunami and earthquake in Japan. On June 17, 2011, the Vietnam Red Cross organized the evaluation meeting of the appeal. In total, the government and the people of Vietnam have donated VND 161,303,484,931, equivalent to US$7,783,393, contributing to the assistance of people affected by the tsunami and earthquake in Japan.

Non-governmental responses

The Japan Center for International Exchange finds that individuals, groups, and corporations in the United States have donated at least $746 million for relief and recovery efforts, the third highest philanthropic outpouring from American donors for any overseas disaster and the most for any disaster in another rich country.
Local Soka Gakkai facilities became refugee shelters and distribution centers for relief supplies. Efforts also included worldwide fundraising for the victims, youth groups, and spiritual support.
A fundraising concert and show in Taiwan attended by some 300 Taiwanese singers and celebrities raised US$26 million for Japan relief.
The Jewish Federations of North America and the American Jewish Joint Distribution Committee raised more than US$2 million. They are working with the Jewish community of Tokyo and  JEN, a Japanese NGO, to provide relief to the residents in the Tohoku region. In association with Israel Defense Forces, JDC set up the a field hospital on the ground in Minamisanriko.
The Roman Catholic Church provided large outreach and prayer for the victims of the disaster and offered large monetary donations from local parishes and churches, along with aid from the Vatican and a call for unity by Pope Benedict.
The United Methodist Committee on Relief has a team responded to the disaster.
The Disciples of Christ Church respond to needs through a Week of Compassion.
The Church of Jesus Christ of Latter-day Saints has committed "Substantial financial help" to Japan. The Church also provided equipment to Japanese fisherman who were unable to work since the earthquake.
The UUA/Unitarian Service Committee (UUSC) Japan Relief Fund has been established to support the recovery efforts in Japan, as they consider the specific efforts to take to support the work of recovery.
The N.C. Baptist Men’s search and rescue team is in Japan assessing needs and distributing food.
A Samaritan’s Purse disaster relief team has arrived in Japan and provide relief supplies to affected residents.
The volunteer medical assistance team in Canada sent a portable field hospital, medical supplies, and medical personnel. Several non-governmental agencies such as the Canadian Red Cross and the Humanitarian Coalition have also collected funds from citizens towards relief efforts in Japan.
The Philippine National Red Cross raised ₱73,336,619.74 (in addition to US$10,000 and ¥30,000) in donations, for a total that exceeded $1.6M.
Relief organizations and local civic groups in South Korea such as the Korean Disaster Relief Association, UNICEF, and the Korean Community Chest set up campaigns to collect donations and aid supplies. Business groups such as Samsung Group, South Korea's largest business conglomerate, said it has donated 100 million yen (US$1.22 million) to help Japan's earthquake relief.
Charitable organizations in Hong Kong such as The Salvation Army, Hong Kong Red Cross, and various student groups have accepted donations for relief efforts.
Charitable organizations in Taiwan such as the Red Cross Society of the Republic of China and the Tzu Chi Foundation launched efforts to raise more funds for relief aid.
Public efforts in Thailand include several charity organizations, fund-raising drives and donation through television and mobile phone networks. Three big mobile phone networks enabled subscribers to raise money by sending text messages to specific numbers, with the network providers then passing on the revenue to the fund-raising drive. Many organizations in Phuket, where the 2004 Asian tsunami struck, such as Bangkok Hospital Phuket have set up donation drives for non-perishable items such as blankets, canned foods and children's essentials.
Numerous NGOs in the United States have contributed to the relief efforts in Japan. Influential business organizations have also made large donations for near-term relief and recovery efforts (e.g. Walmart committed US$5 million in cash and in-kind donations . JPMorgan Chase committed US$5 million). Mobile network services such as AT&T have also offered conditional free phone calls from the United States and Puerto Rico to Japan until March 31, 2011. The American Red Cross, The Salvation Army, the International Medical Corps and a number of other nonprofit organisations have launched mobile donation efforts with groups such as the Give Foundation, the Mobile Giving Foundation, and Mobile Cause to provide aid for those affected. Among the US-based celebrities to have made major donations is Ichiro Suzuki, a Japanese baseball superstar with the Seattle Mariners, who donated ¥100 million ($1.24 million) to the Japanese Red Cross toward the relief effort.
ShelterBox, a disaster relief charity, has provided emergency accommodation to nearly 1600 families, in response to initial requests by Iwate Prefecture authorities for accommodation for 1000 refugees at each of the towns Miyako, Yamada, Kamaishi, Rikuzentakata and Ofunato. The charity has stated it can provide a further 5000 "Shelterboxes" to accommodate another 50,000 people if required.
World Vision Japan, partnering with Delta Air Lines transported aid workers and relief supplies to Japan. Delta frequent flyer's SkyMiles card holders could donate their miles to World Vision Japan, collectively 5 million miles were donated. Additionally World Vision partnership across the globe is appealing for $10 million to fund its response in Japan, which may continue for several years. World Vision staff planned to focus their attention on providing vital relief supplies and Child-Friendly Spaces.

Mercy Corps worked in devastated areas of northeastern Japan alongside local partner to bring relief and recovery to survivors. In the weeks after the earthquake and tsunami, the two organizations focused on providing relief items – tents, tarps, blankets, heaters, clothes, water, food and school and hygiene supplies – to survivors. As supplies of essential items have become more accessible, efforts have shifted to economic recovery and post-trauma work. Together, Mercy Corps and Peace Winds Japan projects  have helped to support 148,000 people in need who live in four northeastern towns: Ofunato, Rikuzentakata, Kesennuma and Minamisanriku.

Numerous charitable organizations in Singapore have offered to raise funds to the relief efforts for Japan. Mercy Relief has collected S$722,000, including a cheque by the Singapore Soka Association to help aid workers in Japan to purchase relief supplies such as food, blankets and drinking water. It had a five-member team in Japan distributing relief supplies to victims near Iwate Prefecture. World Vision Singapore has also collected more than S$400,000 thus far.
The music industry's four largest record labels (EMI, Sony, Universal, and Warner) collaborated to make Songs for Japan. All proceeds generated from this charity record will go to the Japanese Red Cross Society.
On March 23, 2011, Music for Relief, a charity founded in 2005 by rock band Linkin Park, also released another compilation of albums called Download to Donate: Tsunami Relief, released under Warner Bros. Records. The proceeds will go to Save the Children for the victims of the disasters.
Team Fortress 2 players donated US$430,543.65 to Japan through an in-game hat donation campaign by Valve.
ChildFund Japan distributed emergency supplies to evacuation centers in Natori and Sendai. The emergency supplies included masks, propane gas, diapers, powdered milk, rice canned food, noodles, and seasoning.
A group of seven independent Scottish Whisky Distilleries are collaborating to produce a one-time limited bottling of blended single malt whisky and to donate all proceeds to disaster relief efforts in Japan. Each distillery will donate a cask of their single malt, which will be blended together and named the Spirit of Unity. Production is expected to be roughly 2,000 bottles; 1,200 being sold in the UK, and the remainder being sold in Japan. A small quantity will be sold in New Zealand with proceeds being donated to relief efforts in the wake of the February 2011 Christchurch earthquake. The total proceeds of this initiative are estimated to be at least US$80,000. The collaborating distillers are: Arran, BenRiach, Bladnoch, GlenDronach, Mitchell’s Glengyle, Kilchoman and Springbank.
The Japanese Federation of the Deaf and Disabled Persons International were among those helping with relief efforts for those with special needs and disabilities.
VANK, a South Korean NGO that often contests against Japan, donated 10,000,000 won (US$9000) to the victims on March 16.
Anime Detour, a Minneapolis-St. Paul based convention with 4,500 attendees held yearly holds a charity auction every year. With the earthquake and tsunami in Japan a month before the 2011 Convention the group that holds Anime Detour had all the funds of the charity auction sent to the Red Cross for Japan Relief Effort as well as donation boxes located around the convention. Anime Detour raised $36,243.84 during the three-day convention for the relief efforts.
The Polish catholic organization "Caritas" gathered 3,057,370 PLN for victims in Japan. Polska Akcja Humanitarna gathered 700,000 PLN. All the Polish Catholic bishops appealed for help in their dioceses. Donations were collected on Sunday 27 March. There were numerous concerts and collection in aid of tsunami victims.
The North Korean Chongryon-affiliated Fukushima Korean School sheltered 18 Japanese citizens from March 18 until the end of March.
Japan's three largest professional wrestling promotions, All Japan Pro Wrestling, New Japan Pro-Wrestling and Pro Wrestling Noah, came together on August 27, 2011, in Tokyo, for a charity event named All Together, raising $769,211 for the earthquake victims relief fund. A second All Together'' event was held on February 19, 2012 in Sendai.
Riot Games donated US$160,000 to the American Red Cross in response to this disaster by hosting a special sale of Akali, a character in League of Legends whose design was based on Japanese culture.
Rogers Communications a major Canadian ISP and Cable television provider unlocked all restrictions for Japanese channels for non subscribers and customers for a week following the disaster to allow loved ones to get around the hour coverage from Japanese news stations to assist loved ones with information on relatives and areas effected, they also provided a text number to pledge 5CAD donation toward disaster relief.
The website Something Awful held a fundraiser of sorts that started after posters in their message boards got tired of a user trying to use them as help for his homework, saying they would donate if the user was banned. It later added a head-shaving portion and a blood drive. At least $70,000 dollars was donated to charity, $1,750 in shaved heads and 30 pints of blood was ultimately given.
Sanrio and Ty came up with a special Hello Kitty beanie baby. She is dressed as a nurse. On her pinafore is the Japanese flag. Underneath the red sun, the text reads "I [Heart] Japan". Proceeds from the sale of each plush toy was donated to the American Red Cross for Japan disaster relief.
Right after the disaster, Direct Relief, an emergency response organization, and the Japanese American Citizens League established the Japan Relief and Recovery Fund where they committed 100 percent of all contributions to be used exclusively to help people in Japan in the most productive, efficient manner possible.

Corporate donations
Total corporate donations were US$130,008,543.

Private donations

See also
Songs for Japan
Hideaki Akaiwa

References

 
International responses to natural disasters
2011 in international relations